Peita Margaret Toppano (born 1951) stage name Peta Toppano is an English-born Australian of stage and screen actress, singer and dancer, who is known for her series roles in The Young Doctors, Prisoner, as Karen Travers, Home and Away as Helen Poulos, Heartbreak High and  Return to Eden as Jilly Stewart.

Toppano was married to her Prisoner co-star Barry Quin and subsequently to TV executive and business mogul Kerry Stokes.

Early life

Toppano was born in Finsbury Park, London, England and grew up in Cammeray, New South Wales. The daughter of musicians Enzo Toppano and Peggy Mortimer, she has two younger brothers: Lorenzo and Dean and is of Italian descent. At 16 she won a ballet scholarship to study in Cannes, Southern France. She returned to Australia to study drama at the Ensemble Studio with teacher Hayes Gordon.

Career

Television and film

Toppano's television credits include "Lena" in Piccolo Mondo for SBS, in Prisoner, as original character Karen Travers (a role created for her by producer/writer Reg Watson); in All the Rivers Run, as Eunice Pyke; and in Fields of Fire, as Gina Agostini. Other appearances include  Heartbreak High as Stella on Network Ten and in Bordertown for ABC Television as Diomira.

She also appeared in A Country Practice, G.P., E Street and Flying Doctors. She played Kate in the ABC miniseries The Paper Man with Oliver Tobias, John Bach and Rebecca Gilling (her co-star from Return To Eden), and starred with John Waters and Cybill Shepherd in the 1991 miniseries Which Way Home. Toppano played a recast Jilly Stewart in Return to Eden  and starred in Home and Away as Helen Poulas.

Film credits include Seeing Red, Harbour Beat and Echoes of Paradise, directed by Phillip Noyce. Toppano was nominated for an AFI Award for her work in Street Hero, directed by Michael Pattinson with Vince Colosimo. Other nominations include The Sydney Theatre Critic's Award for her performance in 'Danny and the Deep Blue Sea'. Toppano received two Logie nominations for her work in 'Fields of Fire' as Gina Agostini, and Uke in' Water Under the Bridge'.

Stage (drama and musicals)

Toppano she played Juanita in Sue Woolf's multi-award-winning novel Leaning Towards Infinity in 1997, adapted for stage at the Ensemble theatre to great acclaim.

While living in Perth, Toppano played "Coral" and later "Gwen" in Michael Gow's Away, "Ruth" in Louis Nowra's Così for the Black Swan Theatre Company and Blood Moon for Theatre West.

She starred in a one-woman play written by Heather Nimmo, directed by Leith Taylor called "One Small Step" for which she received great critical acclaim. Toppano played "Countess De Lage" in "The Women" by Clare Boothe Luce with students from Theatre Nepean directed by Mary-Ann Gifford.

She played "Beth" in Merrily We Roll Along for the Sydney Theatre Company with Gina Riley, Greg Stone, Geniveve Lemon, Tom Burlinson and Tony Sheldon.

Toppano played "Fantine" in Les Misérables for the Cameron Mackintosh organisation in Melbourne, Perth and Brisbane, "Diana Morales" in A Chorus Line for two years in Sydney and Melbourne. She played "Sonia" in They're Playing Our Song in the UK, and celebrated her 21st birthday in Godspell.

She played "Claudia" in the musical Nine, Eliza Doolittle (with Stuart Wagstaff) in My Fair Lady, "Monica" in I Love My Wife, "Roberta" in Danny and the Deep Blue Sea and "Leonarda" in Love and Magic in Mama's Kitchen at the Belvoir St Theatre directed by Teresa Crea in Toppano's most exciting role so far.

Toppano speaks French and Italian.

Filmography

Television

Films

Theatre

Footnotes

External links
Peta Toppano Official Website
 

1951 births
Living people
Australian film actresses
Australian musical theatre actresses
Australian soap opera actresses
People from Finsbury Park
English emigrants to Australia
20th-century Australian actresses
21st-century Australian actresses
Australian female dancers
Australian people of Italian descent